Joseph Benedict Carr (22 February 1922 – 3 June 2004) was an Irish amateur golfer.

Carr was born in Inchicore, a suburb of Dublin, Ireland, to George and Margaret Mary "Missie" Waters (the fifth of seven children). At 10 days old, he was adopted by his maternal aunt, Kathleen, and her husband, James Carr, who were childless and had recently returned home from India. The Carrs had just been appointed steward and stewardess of the Portmarnock Golf Club, allowing young Joe to play golf from a very early age.

Carr won his first major tournament, the East of Ireland Amateur, at the age of 19 in 1941, which started one of Ireland's greatest golfing careers. He went on to win twelve East of Ireland titles, twelve West of Ireland titles, six Irish Amateur Close Championships, four Irish Amateur Opens, and three South of Ireland titles.

Carr won The Amateur Championship three times, in 1953, 1958, and 1960, and was runner-up in 1968. He was a semi-finalist at the U.S. Amateur in 1961, and was low amateur at The Open Championship in both 1956 and 1958 (and finished 8th overall in 1960).

In 1967, he became the first Irishman to play in the Masters Tournament. He made three Masters appearances, surviving the cut in 1967 and 1968. He later became the first Irishman to be a member of the Augusta National Golf Club.

Carr received the Bob Jones Award in 1961, the USGA's highest honour, which is given for "distinguished sportsmanship in golf".  He was the first non-American to win the award.

Internationally, Carr represented Ireland in numerous amateur golfing events.  He was a member of a record eleven Walker Cup teams from 1947 to 1967, including non-playing captain in 1965 and playing captain in 1967, amassing a record of 5–14–1. After several years of playing against the United States' top-ranked players, he was moved down in the order for the 1961 event—only to be paired against Jack Nicklaus (who won the match). 

Carr was part of the first winning Irish team at the European Amateur Team Championship in 1965 and again when Ireland successfully defended the title in 1967. After a third and last appearance by Carr in 1969, his son Roddy was a member of the Irish team in 1971, as well as on the winning Great Britain & Ireland Walker Cup team. In 1983 Carr's younger son John was part of the Irish team winning a third title at the European Amateur Team Championship.

Carr played and captained on multiple Eisenhower Trophy teams, and represented Ireland in the Men's Home Internationals every year from 1947 to 1969. Carr retired from competitive golf in 1971. In 1991, Carr was named Captain of The Royal and Ancient Golf Club of St Andrews, the first Irishman to hold the post.  In July 2007, Carr was elected to the World Golf Hall of Fame in the Lifetime Achievement category, and was inducted in November 2007.

From 1992 until his death in 2004, Carr was president of Mount Juliet Golf Club in Kilkenny. Mount Juliet still hosts the annual J.B. Carr Trophy for its members. Two months before Carr's death, his son John became the third Irishman to be invited to join Augusta National Golf Club, after his father and Ian Webb.

Amateur wins (42)
1941 East of Ireland Amateur
1943 East of Ireland Amateur
1945 East of Ireland Amateur
1946 Irish Amateur Open Championship, West of Ireland Amateur, East of Ireland Amateur
1947 West of Ireland Amateur
1948 West of Ireland Amateur, East of Ireland Amateur, South of Ireland Amateur
1950 Irish Amateur Open Championship
1951 West of Ireland Amateur, Golf Illustrated Gold Vase
1953 British Amateur, West of Ireland Amateur
1954 Irish Amateur Open Championship, Irish Amateur Close, West of Ireland Amateur
1955 Gleneagles-Saxone Foursomes Tournament (with Harry Brashaw)
1956 Irish Amateur Open Championship, West of Ireland Amateur, East of Ireland Amateur
1957 Irish Amateur Close, East of Ireland Amateur
1958 British Amateur, West of Ireland Amateur, East of Ireland Amateur
1959 Berkshire Trophy
1960 British Amateur, West of Ireland Amateur, East of Ireland Amateur
1961 West of Ireland Amateur, East of Ireland Amateur
1962 West of Ireland Amateur
1963 Irish Amateur Close
1964 Irish Amateur Close, East of Ireland Amateur
1965 Irish Amateur Close
1966 West of Ireland Amateur, South of Ireland Amateur
1967 Irish Amateur Close
1969 East of Ireland Amateur, South of Ireland Amateur

Major championships

Amateur wins (3)

Results timeline

LA = low amateur
CUT = Missed the half-way cut
"T" indicates a tie for a place
R256, R128, R64, R32, R16, QF, SF = Round in which player lost in match play

Sources: Masters, U.S. Open and U.S. Amateur, Open Championship, 1948 British Amateur, 1949 British Amateur, 1950 British Amateur, 1951 British Amateur, 1952 British Amateur, 1954 British Amateur, 1955 British Amateur, 1956 British Amateur, 1957 British Amateur, 1959 British Amateur

Team appearances
Walker Cup (representing Great Britain & Ireland): 1947, 1949, 1951, 1953, 1955, 1957, 1959, 1961, 1963, 1965 (tied, playing captain), 1967 (playing captain)
Eisenhower Trophy (representing Great Britain & Ireland): 1958, 1960
European Amateur Team Championship (representing Ireland): 1965, (winners) 1967 (winners), 1969
Amateurs–Professionals Match (representing the Amateurs): 1956, 1957, 1958 (winners), 1959, 1960
St Andrews Trophy (representing Great Britain & Ireland): 1956 (winners), 1968 (winners)
Sources:

References

Further reading
Gilleece, Dermot (2004). Breaking 80: The Life and Times of Joe Carr.

External links

Biography page on the Carr family business website
Irish Examiner obituary
Golf Union of Ireland article

Irish male golfers
Amateur golfers
Golf administrators
Sportspeople from County Dublin
World Golf Hall of Fame inductees
1922 births
2004 deaths